Dedi Hartono (born in Bandar Lampung 12 December 1987) is an Indonesian professional footballer who plays as a midfielder for Liga 1 club PS Barito Putera.

International career

International appearances

Honours

Club honors
Semen Padang
Indonesia Premier League: 2011-12

Individual
 Liga 2 Best XI: 2021

References

External links 
 Dedi Hartono at Liga Indonesia
 

1987 births
Living people
Indonesian footballers
Liga 1 (Indonesia) players
Liga 2 (Indonesia) players
Borneo F.C. players
Sriwijaya F.C. players
Semen Padang F.C. players
PS Barito Putera players
Mitra Kukar players
Persiraja Banda Aceh players
Association football wingers
Indonesia international footballers
People from Bandar Lampung
Sportspeople from Lampung